This is the list of episodes of GMA Network's daytime drama Sine Novela.

Sine Novela episodes

Season 1

Sinasamba Kita

Pati Ba Pintig ng Puso

Kung Mahawi Man ang Ulap

Pasan Ko ang Daigdig

Season 2

My Only Love

Maging Akin Ka Lamang

Kaputol ng Isang Awit

Magdusa Ka

Season 3

Gaano Kadalas ang Minsan

Una Kang Naging Akin

Saan Darating ang Umaga?

Paano Ba ang Mangarap?

Season 4

Dapat Ka Bang Mahalin?

Ngayon at Kailanman

Kung Aagawin Mo ang Lahat sa Akin

Kaya Kong Abutin ang Langit

Tinik sa Dibdib

Season 5

Ina, Kasusuklaman Ba Kita?

Gumapang Ka sa Lusak

Basahang Ginto

Trudis Liit

References

See also
Sine Novela

Lists of Philippine drama television series episodes
Lists of soap opera episodes